Blake Countess (born August 8, 1993) is an American football cornerback for the New Jersey Generals of the United States Football League (USFL). He played college football for Michigan, using three years of eligibility between 2011 and 2014. He was an All-Big Ten Conference first-team selection in 2013 after missing most of 2012 due to injury. His 2014 season was less successful and he used his final year of eligibility as a graduate transfer at Auburn in 2015. He was drafted by the Philadelphia Eagles in the sixth round of the 2016 NFL Draft.

High school career
Countess attended Our Lady of Good Counsel High School in Olney, Maryland. As a junior in 2009, he totaled over 50 tackles and 20 pass break-ups.  In May 2010, he was nominated to play in the U.S. Army All-American Bowl high school football all-star game.  As a senior in 2010, Countess averaged 14.7 yards per catch, 35 yards per kickoff return, and 22.9 yards per punt return for Good Counsel.  Countess played both offense and defense for Good Counsel.  His high school coach Bob Milloy noted: "What you're going to get from him is he's a lockdown corner, started both ways for me, and if you don't keep an eye on him, he'll run a punt or kickoff back. He's a very reliable, dependable kid, a good character person ... a good, solid citizen, great kid, and good football player."

College football
After a highly successful high school football career at Our Lady of Good Counsel High School, Countess accepted a football scholarship from the University of Michigan where he played from 2011 to 2014. After graduating, he would decide to transfer to Auburn University to play out his final year of NCAA eligibility as a redshirt senior.

Recruiting and Army All-American Game
During the 2010 recruiting season, Countess was pursued by many top collegiate football programs including Notre Dame, Stanford, Penn State, Michigan, Tennessee, Arkansas, Wisconsin, West Virginia, Pitt, Georgia Tech, Purdue, Maryland, Cincinnati, Louisville, Duke, Illinois, Virginia, and Wake Forest.

In early December 2010, Countess was selected as an Army All-American.  At the U.S. Army All-American Bowl played on January 8, 2011, Countess did not allow a single pass completion to any receiver he covered, and the opposing quarterbacks chose not to throw many passes in his direction.

Commitment to Michigan
On December 17, 2010, Countess announced his verbal commitment to attend the University of Michigan.  He noted that, after visiting Ann Arbor, he "fell in love with Ann Arbor, the coaches, the school, the football legacy, the Big House, and it's just where I felt at home."  He was regarded as the top prospect in Michigan's 2011 recruiting class.  ESPN.com called him "a natural cover guy with good size and speed," and noted that he has "all the tools to be an outstanding player in college."  Three weeks after Countess committed to Michigan, the school's head coach Rich Rodriguez was fired. After the firing, Countess's high school coach noted that the move was unlikely to effect Countess's commitment.  He noted that Countess was aware of rumors about Rodriguez being fired before giving his commitment and noted, "He said he picked Michigan because of the school."  He signed his letter of intent with Michigan in February 2011.

Michigan career
Countess saw his first substantial playing time for the 2011 Michigan Wolverines football team in the fourth quarter of a 28–7 victory over San Diego State on September 24, 2011.  In less than one quarter, Countess accumulated seven tackles and broke up a pass in the endzone from quarterback Ryan Lindley.  After the game, Michigan lineman Ryan Van Bergen noted that Countess has "a swagger about him."  The following week, Countess again drew praise for forcing a fumble and leading the team in tackles in a 58–0 win over Minnesota.  He received the Next Level Player of the Week award from Matt Bracken of The Baltimore Sun. For the season, he earned 2011 Big Ten All-Freshman team recognition from ESPN.com and BTN.com as well as 2011 TSN first-team All-Freshman and College Football News All-Freshman honorable mention honors.

Countess injured his anterior cruciate ligament in the season opener for the 2012 Michigan Wolverines football team against Alabama. He returned as a redshirt sophomore to be a 2013 All-Big Ten Conference football team first-team selection by the media and second-team selection the coaches. However, the following year as a redshirt junior he only received honorable mention All-Big Ten recognition from the media.

Auburn
On May 13, 2015, Countess announced his decision to transfer from Michigan. After a brief recruiting process with various different schools, on May 26 he announced he would be a graduate transfer for the 2015 Auburn Tigers football team, and his enrollment was official by May 28. He had also been recruited by Arizona, Oklahoma and Oklahoma State.

Professional career

Philadelphia Eagles
Countess was selected by the Eagles in the sixth round, 196th overall, in the 2016 NFL Draft. On September 3, 2016, he was released by the Eagles.

Los Angeles Rams
On September 6, 2016, Countess was signed to the Los Angeles Rams practice squad. He was promoted to the Rams' active roster on November 18, 2016.

In Week 3 of the 2018 season, Countess returned two kicks for 51 yards and recovered a blocked punt for a touchdown in a 35-23 win over the Los Angeles Chargers, earning him NFC Special Teams Player of the Week.

On March 12, 2019, the Rams tendered Countess as a restricted free agent.

On May 2, 2019, the Rams waived Countess.

Philadelphia Eagles (second stint)
On May 3, 2019, Countess was claimed off waivers by the Philadelphia Eagles. He was waived on August 13, 2019.

New York Jets
On October 15, 2019, Countess was signed by the New York Jets.

On March 11, 2020, Countess was released by the Jets.

Philadelphia Eagles (third stint)
On December 16, 2020, Countess was signed to the Philadelphia Eagles practice squad. He was elevated to the active roster on December 19 and January 2, 2021, for the team's weeks 15 and 17 games against the Arizona Cardinals and Washington Football Team, and reverted to the practice squad after each game. He signed a reserve/future contract with the Eagles on January 4, 2021, and was released on March 9, 2021.

On August 9, 2021, Countess re-signed with the Eagles. He was placed on injured reserve on August 31, 2021. He was released on September 9, 2021.

Baltimore Ravens
On December 1, 2021, Countess was signed to the Baltimore Ravens practice squad. He was released on December 28.

Los Angeles Rams (second stint)
Countess signed to the Los Angeles Rams practice squad on January 12, 2022. Countess was elevated to the active roster and won Super Bowl LVI when the Rams defeated the Cincinnati Bengals.

New Jersey Generals
On January 26, 2023, Countess signed with the New Jersey Generals of the United States Football League (USFL).

NFL career statistics

References

External links
  Auburn Tigers bio
 Los Angeles Rams bio

1993 births
Living people
American football cornerbacks
American football safeties
Auburn Tigers football players
Baltimore Ravens players
Los Angeles Rams players
Michigan Wolverines football players
New Jersey Generals (2022) players
New York Jets players
People from Olney, Maryland
Philadelphia Eagles players
Players of American football from Maryland
Sportspeople from Montgomery County, Maryland